Abyla haeckeli is a colonial siphonophore in the family Abylidae. It was described in 1908.

Description
The species has an anterior nectophore that is the same width and length but it does not provide wing functions. A transverse ridge separates the ventral facet from the apico-ventral facet. The posterior nectophore can have up to 5 teeth on one comb. It also has lateral ostial teeth that are closer to the dorsal tooth rather than the ventral teeth.

Distribution
The species has been reported near the Philippines and Japan in the upper parts of the water column.

References

Plankton
Species described in 1908
Abylidae
Bioluminescent cnidarians